Piano Sonata in E major may refer to:

 Piano Sonata No. 9 (Beethoven)
 Piano Sonata No. 30 (Beethoven)
 Piano Sonata in E major, D 157 (Schubert)
 Piano Sonata in E major, D 459 (Schubert)